Mark Marie Robert Karpelès (born 1 June 1985), also sometimes known by his online alias MagicalTux, is the former CEO of bitcoin exchange Mt. Gox. Born in France, he moved to Japan in 2009.

Early life and education
Born in Chenôve, France, he is the child of Anne-Robert Karpelès, a geologist. He was raised in Dijon. Between 1995 and 2000 he was educated at Collège Prieuré de Binson in Châtillon-sur-Marne, near Dormans. He then spent one year at Lycée Claude Bernard in Paris before completing his education in 2003 at Lycée Louis Armand in Paris.

Career
According to Karpelès' LinkedIn page, he worked from 2003 to 2005 at Linux Cyberjoueurs as a software developer and network administrator. Karpelès is a PHP developer.

In 2009, Karpelès founded Tibanne Co. Ltd., a Japan-based bitcoin related technology provider. He is CEO. He was a founding member of the Bitcoin Foundation, created in 2012 with a mission to standardize and promote bitcoin, and served on its board until February 2014.

Karpelès acquired the Mt. Gox Bitcoin exchange site from programmer Jed McCaleb in 2011 which was later incorporated in Tokyo, with its original owner receiving 12% shares of the new company. Mt. Gox filed for bankruptcy in Japan on 28 February 2014, and for Chapter 15, Title 11, United States Code bankruptcy in the United States (Texas) in March 2014.

Karpelès was subpoenaed by the United States Department of the Treasury's Financial Crimes Enforcement Network to appear in Washington, D.C. to provide testimony on 18 April 2014. In a court filing by Mt. Gox lawyers, Karpelès responded that he did not have a lawyer for this matter and therefore declined to appear. He sought to appear in D.C. to testify on 5 May 2014.

According to a joint report by Cyrus Farivar of Ars Technica and Pierre Alonso of Le Monde, Karpelès was found guilty of fraud when he was tried in absentia in France in 2010. He also admitted to having "pirated" a server to French authorities. He was sentenced to a suspended year in jail.

The lawyers for Ross William Ulbricht, defending him at his trial for operating the undercover Silk Road marketplace, claimed in 2015 that the pseudonymous "Dread Pirate Roberts" behind Silk Road was not him but Karpelès. The Department of Homeland Security had also suspected as such in 20122013. Karpelès publicly denied the claim on Twitter and Ulbricht was eventually found guilty.

After the collapse of Mt. Gox, Karpelès joined London Trust Media, the company behind Freenode and Private Internet Access, as its CTO in April 2018.

Arrest and prosecution
Karpelès was arrested on 1 August 2015, by Japanese police on suspicion of having accessed the exchange's computer system to falsify data on its outstanding balance; he was re-arrested and allegedly charged with embezzlement.

Karpelès was released on bail in July 2016, but was required to remain in Japan.

On 10 July 2017, he pled "not guilty" to embezzlement and data manipulation charges.

On 14 March 2019, the Tokyo District Court found Karpelès guilty of falsifying data to inflate Mt. Gox’s holdings by $33.5 million, for which he was sentenced to 30 months in prison, suspended for four years, meaning he will serve no time unless he commits additional offenses over the next four years. The Court acquitted Karpelès on a number of other charges, including embezzlement and aggravated breach of trust, based on its belief that Karpelès had acted without ill intent. Nonetheless, the verdict said Karpelès had inflicted “massive harm to the trust of his users” and there was “no excuse” for him to “abuse his status and authority to perform clever criminal acts.” Karpelès issued a statement saying he was “happy to be judged not guilty” on the more serious charges and was discussing how to proceed with his lawyers regarding his conviction on the falsifying data charge.

Bankruptcy proceedings
Mt. Gox's bankruptcy proceedings were scheduled to repay creditors in Japanese yen at a price around 483 US dollars per bitcoin (total of 45.6 billion Japanese yen or 400 million US dollars), and it was reported that this would leave Karpelès, after creditors are repaid, with the bulk of the wealth left over from the difference. Based on the market price at the beginning of 2022 (around $35,000 per bitcoin), the difference is gargantuan, and such a ruling would leave Karpelès with bitcoins valued at more than 3.27 billion US dollars.

In June 2018, The Tokyo District court approved a petition by creditors to begin civil rehabilitation proceedings in lieu of bankruptcy. As these proceedings are more flexible, creditors expected that they would be compensated based on the current value of their lost coins. On 23 August 2018, creditors were able to begin filing new claims under the civil rehabilitation proceedings. However, by June 2021, the U.S. Federal lawsuit by Mt. Gox customers was unable to proceed as a class-action lawsuit, putting hope of compensation in jeopardy.

References

External links
 

1985 births
Businesspeople in software
Computer criminals
French criminals
French chief executives
French computer programmers
French fraudsters
French expatriates in Japan
Living people
People associated with Bitcoin
PHP writers